Nicola or Niccolò Contestabili  (1759–1824) was an Italian painter, mainly depicting history and landscapes in a Neoclassic style.

Biography
His father Antonio Contestabili was a landscape and quadratura painter. Born in Pontremoli, Nicola moved to Florence in 1778 to study under Francesco Zuccarelli. Nicola also painted the sipario or theater curtain for the Persio Flacco Theater in Volterra. He returned to live in Pontremoli from 1786 to 1802, when he returned to Florence. In Pontremoli, he painted scenes of Niobe and Aurora for the Casa Gramoli. He also painted in Casa Martelli. He died in Florence.

References

1759 births
1824 deaths
18th-century Italian painters
Italian male painters
19th-century Italian painters
Painters from Tuscany
Italian neoclassical painters
19th-century Italian male artists
18th-century Italian male artists